Kosmos 105 ( meaning Cosmos 105) or Zenit-2 No.38 was a Soviet, first generation, low resolution, optical film-return reconnaissance satellite launched in 1966.

Kosmos 105 was launched by a Vostok-2 rocket flying from Site 31/6 at the Baikonur Cosmodrome. The launch took place at 08:38 GMT on 22 January 1966, and following its successful arrival in orbit the spacecraft received its Kosmos designation, along with the International Designator 1966-003A and the Satellite Catalog Number 01945.

On 30 January 1966, after eight days in orbit, the satellite was deorbited with its return capsule descending by parachute for recovery by Soviet force.

References

Kosmos satellites
Spacecraft launched in 1966
Spacecraft which reentered in 1966
Zenit-2 satellites
1966 in the Soviet Union